Kaffir  is an exonym and an ethnic slur  the use of it in reference to black Africans and Cape Coloureds being particularly common in South Africa. In Arabic, the word kafīr ("unbeliever") was originally applied to pagans who were neither Muslims nor People of the Book before becoming predominantly focused on pagan zanj (black African) who were increasingly used as slaves. During the Age of Exploration in early modern Europe, variants of the Latin term  (pl. ) were adopted in reference to non-Muslim Bantu peoples even when they were monotheistic. It was eventually used, particularly in Afrikaans, for any black and Cape Coloured person  during the Apartheid era and, closely associated with South African racism, it became a pejorative by the mid-20th century and is now considered extremely offensive hate speech. Punishing continuing use of the term was one of the concerns of the Promotion of Prevention of Unfair Discrimination Act enacted by the South African parliament in the year 2000 and it is now euphemistically addressed as the K-word in South African English.

Etymology

The term has its etymological roots in the Arabic word kāfir, usually translated as "disbeliever" or "non-believer" for "one without religion". Given the Islamic concept of People of the Bookincluding Jews, Christians, and in some cases believers in certain other monotheistic faiths like Zoroastrianismthe term was particularly focused on pagans and in modern Arabic on atheists, those who completely deny the existence of God. The word is primarily used without racial connection, although in some contexts it was particularly used for the pagan zanj along the Swahili coast who were an early focus of the Arab slave trade. Portuguese explorers who arrived on the East African coast in 1498 en route to India found it in common use by coastal Arabs, although the Muslim Swahili locals preferred to use washenzi ("uncivilized") for the pagan people of the interior. The poet Camões used the lusitanized plural form  in the fifth canto of his famous 1572 epic The Lusiads. Variations of the word were used in English, Portuguese, Spanish, French, Dutch, and later Afrikaans as a general term for several different ethnic groups in Southern Africa from the 17th century to the early 20th century. As English kaffir and Afrikaans , the term became a pejorative slur for Bantus and other black groups, including Cape Coloureds during the Apartheid era of South African history to the point that it is regarded as hate speech under current South African law.

Historical usage

Early English
The 16th century explorer Leo Africanus described the Cafri as non-Islamic "negroes", and one of five principal population groups in Africa. According to him, they were "as blacke as pitch, and of a mightie stature, and (as some thinke) descended of the Jews; but now they are idolators." Leo Africanus identified the Cafri's geographical heartland as being located in remote southern Africa, an area which he designated as Cafraria.

Following Leo Africanus, the works of Richard Hakluyt designate this population as "Cafars and Gawars, which is, infidels or misbeleeuers". Hakluyt refers to slaves ("slaues called Cafari") and certain inhabitants of Ethiopia ("and they vse to goe in small shippes, and trade with the Cafars") by two different but similar names. The word is also used in allusion to a portion of the coast of Africa ("land of Cafraria"). On early European maps of the 16th and 17th centuries, Southern Africa northwest of the "Hottentots" (Khoikhoi) was likewise called by cartographers Cafreria.

Colonial period
The word was used to describe monotheistic peoples (Nguni ethnic groups in particular) of South Africa, who were not of a Christian or of an Islamic religious background, without derogatory connotations, during the Dutch and British colonial periods until the early twentieth century. It appears in many historical accounts by anthropologists, missionaries and other observers, as well as in academic writings. For example, the Pitt Rivers Museum in Oxford originally labeled many African artifacts as "Kaffir" in origin. The 1911 Encyclopædia Britannica made frequent use of the term, to the extent of having an article of that title.

The late nineteenth–early twentieth century novelist, H. Rider Haggard, frequently used the term "kaffir" in his novels of dark Africa, especially those of the great white hunter, Allan Quatermain, as a then inoffensive term for black people in the region.

Similar non-derogatory usage can be found in the John Buchan novel Prester John from 1910.

Apartheid-era South Africa
During the South African general election in 1948, those who supported the establishment of an apartheid regime campaigned under the openly racist slogan "" ("The kaffir in his place").

In the case of Butana Almond Nofomela, while working as an undercover policeman during the early 1980s, Nofomela stabbed to death a Brits farmer, Lourens. Nofomela had only intended to rob the wealthy tiller, but Lourens confronted him with a firearm and called him kaffir. This enraged Nofomela, who then killed the farmer.

The Afrikaans term  (Kaffir brother) was also often used to describe a white person who fraternised with or sympathized with the cause of the black and Cape Coloured community.

Namibia
Much as in South Africa the term was used as a general derogatory reference to blacks. A 2003 report by the Namibian Labour Resource and Research Institute states:

Modern usage

Post-apartheid South Africa
In 2000, the parliament of South Africa enacted the Promotion of Prevention of Unfair Discrimination Act. The Act's primary objectives include the prevention of hate speech terms, such as kaffir:

Notwithstanding the end of Apartheid and the above-mentioned Act, usage of the word in South Africa continues today.

In February 2008, there was huge media and public outcry in South Africa after Irvin Khoza, then chairperson of the 2010 FIFA World Cup organizing committee, used the term during a press briefing in reference to a journalist.

A statement made during the 5 March 2008 sitting of the South African Parliament shows how the usage of the word is seen today:

The phrase the K-word is now often used to avoid using the word itself, similar to the N-word, used to represent nigger.

In 2012, a woman was jailed overnight and fined after pleading guilty to crimen injuria for using the word as a racial slur at a gym.

In July 2014, the Supreme Court of Appeal upheld a 2012 conviction for offences of crimen injuria and assault relating to an argument about parking in which a man used the word. The judgement states:

In March 2018, Vicki Momberg became the first woman to be convicted of racist language for using the term over 40 times at two South African police officers.

Examples
Some indicative examples:

 Mahatma Gandhi: "The latest papers received from South Africa, unfortunately for the Natal Government, lend additional weight to my statement that the Indian is cruelly persecuted being in South Africa ... A picnic party of European children used Indian and Kaffir boys as targets and shot bullets into their faces, hurting several inoffensive children." – Letter to the editor of The Times of India, 17 October 1896.
 Winston Churchill, during the Boer War, wrote of his "irritation that Kaffirs should be allowed to fire on white men".
 John Philip Sousa's 1914 concert suite "Tales of a Traveler", composed after his band's tour to South Africa, contains a movement titled "The Kaffir on the Karoo".
 At the start of the 1946 Sherlock Holmes film Terror by Night, the narrator speaks of a famous diamond "First touched by the fingers of the humble kaffir..." while a black man is shown picking up a stone from the ground.
 Kaffir is the title of a 1995 hit song by the black Johannesburg Kwaito artist Arthur Mafokate. The lyrics say, "don't call me a kaffir". This song is considered one of the first hits of the Kwaito genre, and is said to have set precedent for the post-apartheid generation struggle of combining dance music with the new phenomenon of freedom of expression in South Africa.
 Kaffir Boy is the title of Mark Mathabane's autobiography, who grew up in the township of Alexandra, travelled to the United States on a tennis scholarship, and became a successful author in his adoptive homeland.
 In the film Lethal Weapon 2, South African criminal Arjen Rudd (played by Joss Ackland), his colleague Pieter Vorstedt (played by Derrick O'Connor) and their followers frequently refer to Danny Glover's character Roger Murtaugh, who is African American, as a "kaffir". His partner Detective Martin Riggs (Mel Gibson) is referred to as a "kaffir-lover". At the end of the movie when Riggs and Murtaugh kill off the villains (who were smuggling illicit drugs hidden in coffee), Murtaugh says they were "de-kaffirnated".
 South African cricket players complained that they were racially abused by some spectators during a December 2005 Test match against host country Australia held in Perth. Makhaya Ntini, a black player in the team, was taunted with the word "kaffir". Other white players such as Shaun Pollock, Justin Kemp, Garnett Kruger were subjected to shouts of kaffirboetie, an Afrikaans term which means "brother of a kaffir".
 Australian tennis player Brydan Klein was fined $16,000 following a qualifying match at the Eastbourne International, June 2009, for unsportsmanlike conduct after allegedly calling his South African Cape Coloured opponent, Raven Klaasen, a "kaffir".
 In the film Blood Diamond (2006), Leonardo DiCaprio's character Danny Archer refers to Djimon Hounsou's character Solomon Vandy as a kaffir, which triggers the start of a vicious fistfight.

Kaffir lime

"Kaffir lime" is one of the names of a citrus fruit native to tropical countries in South and South East Asia. Its etymology is uncertain, but most likely was originally used by Muslims as a reference to the location the plant grew, which was in countries populated by non-Muslims (Hindus and Buddhists). Under this interpretation, the plant name shares an origin with the South African term, both ultimately derived from kafir, the Arabic word for "non-believer". The fruit name as such never had any offensive connotations, but due to the present negative connotations of "Kaffir" The Oxford Companion to Food recommends that the alternative term "makrut lime" be favored when speaking of this fruit.

See also
Blackfella
Coloured
Coolie
History of South Africa
Kaffir lime
Kafir
Kafiristan
Kaffraria
Kaffrine
Moors
Nigger
Sri Lankan Kaffirs
List of ethnic slurs
CAFR

References

External links
Kaffirs in Sri Lanka: Descendants of enslaved Africans
 The transcripts of the Human Rights Violations Hearings & Submissions of the Truth and Reconciliation Commission contains a large number of references to the use of the word kaffir during the South African Apartheid era.
 The Provenance of the term ‘Kafir’ in South Africa and the notion of Beginning by Gabeba Baderoon
 

Historical definition of the term from the Nutall Encyclopedia, 1907

Anti-African and anti-black slurs
Anti-black racism in South Africa
South African English